Venusia pallidaria is a moth in the family Geometridae first described by George Hampson in 1903. It is found in Pakistan.

References

Moths described in 1903
Venusia (moth)